The Cincinnati Reds' 1991 season was a season in American baseball. It consisted of the Cincinnati Reds attempting to win the National League West.

Offseason
 January 29, 1990: Skeeter Barnes was signed as a free agent by the Reds.
 December 5, 1990: Bill Doran was signed as a free agent with the Cincinnati Reds.

Regular season
 June 28, 1991: Barry Larkin had six RBIs in a game against the Houston Astros.
 Barry Larkin had a 19-game hitting streak.
 At the beginning of July, the Reds peaked at ten games above .500 (44-34). They were in second place in the NL West, only four games behind the Dodgers, and 3.5 games ahead of third place Atlanta.
 The Reds lost 14 of 16 games (including a 10-game losing streak) during a stretch in July, which saw the Reds essentially drop from contention. They were never above .500 the remainder of the season.

Season standings

Record vs. opponents

Notable transactions
 June 14, 1991: Reggie Jefferson was traded by the Cincinnati Reds to the Cleveland Indians for Tim Costo.
 July 18, 1991: Stan Jefferson was signed as a free agent with the Cincinnati Reds.

Roster

Player stats

Batting

Starters by position
Note: Pos = Position; G = Games played; AB = At bats; H = Hits; Avg. = Batting average; HR = Home runs; RBI = Runs batted in

Other batters
Note: G = Games played; AB = At bats; H = Hits; Avg. = Batting average; HR = Home runs; RBI = Runs batted in

Pitching

Starting pitchers
Note: G = Games pitched; IP = Innings pitched; W = Wins; L = Losses; ERA = Earned run average; SO = Strikeouts

Other pitchers
Note: G = Games pitched; IP = Innings pitched; W = Wins; L = Losses; ERA = Earned run average; SO = Strikeouts

Relief pitchers
Note: G = Games pitched; W = Wins; L = Losses; SV = Saves; ERA = Earned run average; SO = Strikeouts

Awards and honors

All-Star Game
 Tom Browning, pitcher
 Rob Dibble, relief pitcher
 Barry Larkin, shortstop
 Lou Piniella, manager

Farm system

References

1991 Cincinnati Reds season at Baseball Reference

Cincinnati Reds seasons
Cincinnati Reds season
Cinc